"God Save the King" is the national anthem of the United Kingdom and the royal anthem of Commonwealth realms (Canada, Australia, etc.) and various territories, when there is a male monarch.

God Save the King, or a similar variant, may also refer to:
 E Ola Ke Alii Ke Akua, "God Save the King", Hawaiian national anthem
 "Bevare Gud vår kung", "God Save our King", Swedish royal anthem
 God (?) Save Our King!, anime and manga property
 "God Save His King", a song by Lee "Scratch" Perry album from the album Repentance 
 God Save the King (Robert Fripp album) a 1986 compilation album by Robert Fripp
 God Save the King (album), a 2012 album by Copywrite

See also
 God Save Emperor Francis, personal anthem of Holy Roman Emperor Francis II
 God Save the Tsar!, national anthem of Imperial Russia
 God Save the Queen (disambiguation)